Phytophthora katsurae is a plant pathogen. It was first isolated from chestnut (Castanea) trees in Japan. It has also been reported from Taiwan, Papua New Guinea, Australia and Korea.

References

External links
 Index Fungorum
 USDA ARS Fungal Database

katsurae
Water mould plant pathogens and diseases
Nut tree diseases